Riverbend may refer to:
 A knee or a meander in a river

Places

Australia 
 Riverbend, Queensland, a suburb in Logan City

Canada 
Riverbend, Calgary, a neighborhood in Calgary, Alberta
Riverbend, Edmonton
Riverbend, a village in Quebec, now part of the town of Alma

United States 

Riverbend, California, community in Fresno County

Riverbend, Columbus, Ohio, neighborhood of Columbus
Riverbend (Hudson County), two sections of Hudson County, New Jersey
Riverbend, Montana, census-designated place in Mineral County
Riverbend (Tampa), a neighborhood within the City of Tampa, Florida
Riverbend, Washington, census-designated place in King County
Riverbend, Illinois, a small region part of the Metro East of the St Louis Metropolitan area

Other 
Riverbend Apartments, in Atlanta, Georgia, United States
Riverbend (blogger)
Riverbend (estate) historic house in Kohler, Wisconsin

Riverbend Festival, annual music festival in Chattanooga, Tennessee, United States
Riverbend (film), a 1989 film directed by Sam Firstenberg
Riverbend High School, in Spotsylvania, Virginia
Riverbend Mall, in Rome, Georgia, United States
Riverbend Maximum Security Institution, prison in Tennessee, United States
Riverbend Music Center, live concert venue in Cincinnati, Ohio, United States

See also
River Bend (disambiguation)